Lobelia georgiana, the Georgia lobelia, is a species of flowering plant in the family Campanulaceae, native to the southeastern United States. It is likely that the range of Lobelia georgiana only extends to Alabama, Georgia and Florida due to misidentification of specimens.

References

georgiana
Endemic flora of the United States
Flora of the Southeastern United States
Plants described in 1940
Flora without expected TNC conservation status